Minnesota State Highway 267 (MN 267) is a  highway in southwest Minnesota, which runs from its intersection with Murray County State-Aid Highway 4 (Grace Avenue) in Iona and continues north to its northern terminus at its intersection with State Highway 30, 1.5 miles west of Slayton.

Route description
Highway 267 serves as a north–south connector route in southwest Minnesota between Iona and State Highway 30 near Slayton.

Highway 267 follows Parnell Street in Iona.

It passes by the runway for the Slayton Municipal Airport near its northern terminus.

The route is legally defined as Route 267 in the Minnesota Statutes.

History
Highway 267 was authorized on July 1, 1949.

The route was paved in 1951.

The 2021 Minnesota Legislature authorized removal of the route, to become effective when a turnback agreement is reached with Murray County.

Major intersections

References

External links

Highway 267 at the Unofficial Minnesota Highways Page

267
Transportation in Murray County, Minnesota